Żerniki Małe  is a village in the administrative district of Gmina Kobierzyce, within Wrocław County, Lower Silesian Voivodeship, in south-western Poland.

References

Villages in Wrocław County